George Wayne Wright (born March 3, 1947) is a former American football defensive tackle who played three seasons in the National Football League (NFL) with the Baltimore Colts and Cleveland Browns. He was drafted by the Colts in the ninth round of the 1969 NFL Draft. He played college football at Sam Houston State University and attended C.E. King High School in Houston, Texas. He was a member of the Baltimore Colts team that won Super Bowl V.

References

External links
Just Sports Stats

1947 births
Living people
Players of American football from Houston
African-American players of American football
American football defensive tackles
Sam Houston Bearkats football players
Baltimore Colts players
Cleveland Browns players
21st-century African-American people
20th-century African-American sportspeople